Senator Hoagland may refer to:

Frank Hoagland (fl. 2010s), Ohio State Senate
Peter Hoagland (1941–2007), Nebraska State Senate